Gregg Giuffria (born July 28, 1951) is an American rock musician and businessman.  He was the keyboardist for AOR bands Angel, House of Lords, and Giuffria.

Career
Giuffria is originally from Gulfport, Mississippi, graduating from high school in 1969.  A talented keyboardist, he played in several local bands including The Telstars and Flower Power (who released several singles on the Tune Kel label), he moved to the US West Coast where in the mid 1970s he joined Angel. After the band broke up in 1981 Giuffria put together his own band, Giuffria, with vocalist David Glen Eisley, guitarist Craig Goldy, bassist Chuck Wright, and drummer Alan Krigger, and achieved some success with their first eponymous album and first single "Call to the Heart," which made the Top 20 on the Billboard Hot 100. The band broke up after the commercial failure of their next album "Silk and Steel" in 1986.

Giuffria then put together the House of Lords with the help of Kiss' Gene Simmons and signed to Simmons' label. The first album House of Lords, was released in 1988 and experienced a modest amount of commercial success with the single "I Wanna Be Loved".  However, this success was not consolidated as the band were unwilling to tour.

Gregg was also the CEO of the Las Vegas-based Outland Development LLC, that designed and built gaming machines and theme park attractions, and was president of casino operator Full House Resorts from 1998 to 2000.  He is also co-owner of the Biloxi Hard Rock Hotel and Casino, along with partners Roy Anderson III and David Ross. Gregg now lives in California.

Discography

With Angel
 Angel (1975)
 Helluva Band (1976)
 On Earth as It Is in Heaven (1977)
 White Hot (1978)
 Sinful (1979)
 Live Without a Net (1980)

With Giuffria
 Giuffria (1984)
 Gotcha! OST (1985)
 Silk and Steel (1986)
 Giuffria III (unreleased) (1987)

With House of Lords
 House of Lords (1988)
 Sahara (1990)
 Demons Down (1992)
 World Upside Down'' as guest keyboardist (2006)

References 

1951 births
American hard rock musicians
American heavy metal keyboardists
American people of Italian descent
American rock keyboardists
Angel (band) members
Giuffria members
House of Lords (band) members
Living people
People from Gulfport, Mississippi
21st-century American keyboardists
20th-century American keyboardists